Nick Holonyak Jr. (November 3, 1928September 18, 2022) was an American engineer and educator. He is noted particularly for his 1962 invention and first demonstration of a semiconductor laser diode that emitted visible light. This device was the forerunner of the first generation of commercial light-emitting diodes (LEDs). He was then working at a General Electric Company research laboratory near Syracuse, New York. He left General Electric in 1963 and returned to his alma mater, the University of Illinois at Urbana-Champaign, where he later became John Bardeen Endowed Chair in Electrical and Computer Engineering and Physics.

Early life and career
Nick Holonyak Jr. was born in Zeigler, Illinois, on November 3, 1928. His parents were Rusyn immigrants. His father worked in a coal mine. Holonyak was the first member of his family to receive any type of formal schooling.  He once worked 30 straight hours on the Illinois Central Railroad before realizing that a life of hard labor was not what he wanted and he would prefer to go to school instead. According to a Chicago Tribune article in 2003, "The cheap and reliable semiconductor lasers critical to DVD players, bar code readers and scores of other devices owe their existence in some small way to the demanding workload thrust upon Downstate railroad crews decades ago."

Holonyak earned his bachelor's (1950), master's (1951), and doctoral (1954) degrees in electrical engineering from the University of Illinois at Urbana-Champaign. Holonyak was John Bardeen's first doctoral student there. In 1954, Holonyak went to Bell Telephone Laboratories, where he worked on silicon-based electronic devices. From 1955 to 1957 he served with the U.S. Army Signal Corps.

From 1957 to 1963 he was a scientist at the General Electric Company's Advanced Semiconductor Laboratory near Syracuse, New York. Here he invented, fabricated, and demonstrated the first visible light laser diode on October 9, 1962. He grew crystals of the alloy GaAs0.60P0.40; a GaAs laser diode that worked in the infrared had recently been demonstrated by his General Electric colleague Robert N. Hall. The GaAs0.60P0.40 laser diode worked at low temperatures, but the device still functioned as a light-emitting diode at room temperature. The demonstration of red light emission from the diode inspired the article "Light of Hope – or Terror" in Reader's Digest. GaAsP was the material used for the first generation of commercial LEDs that came to market a few years later.

University of Illinois
In 1963, Holonyak became a professor at the University of Illinois. In 1993, he was named the John Bardeen Endowed Chair Professor of Electrical and Computer Engineering and Physics at the University of Illinois at Urbana-Champaign. He investigated methods for manufacturing quantum dot lasers. He and Dr. Milton Feng ran a transistor laser research center at the university funded by $6.5 million from the United States Department of Defense through DARPA. Holonyak retired in 2013.

Ten of his 60 former doctoral students have developed new uses for LED technology at Philips Lumileds Lighting Company in Silicon Valley.

Inventions

In addition to introducing the III-V alloy LED, Holonyak held 41 patents.  His other inventions include the red-light semiconductor laser, usually called the laser diode (used in CD and DVD players and cell phones) and the shorted emitter p-n-p-n switch (used in light dimmers and power tools).

In 2006, the American Institute of Physics decided on the five most important papers in each of its journals since it was founded 75 years ago. Two of these five papers, in the journal Applied Physics Letters, were co-authored by Holonyak. The first one, co-authored with S. F. Bevacqua in 1962, announced the creation of the first visible-light laser diode. The second, co-authored primarily with Milton Feng in 2005, announced the creation of a transistor laser that can operate at room temperatures.  Holonyak predicted that his LEDs would replace the incandescent light bulb of Thomas Edison in the February 1963 issue of Reader's Digest, and as LEDs improve in quality and efficiency they are gradually replacing incandescents as the bulb of choice.

Awards and honors
Holonyak was presented awards by George H. W. Bush, George W. Bush, Emperor Akihito of Japan, and Vladimir Putin. He also received the Global Energy International Prize, the National Medal of Technology, the Order of Lincoln Medallion, and the 2004 Lemelson–MIT Prize, also worth $500,000. Many colleagues expressed their belief that he deserved the Nobel Prize for his invention of the GaAsP laser and LED.  On this subject, Holonyak said, "It's ridiculous to think that somebody owes you something. We're lucky to be alive, when it comes down to it." In October 2014, Holonyak reversed his stance by stating "I find this one insulting" in reaction to news that the inventors of the blue LED were awarded the 2014 Nobel Prize in Physics, instead of his fellow LED researchers.

 1973: Elected a member of the National Academy of Engineering for contributions to development of semiconductor controlled rectifiers, light emitting diodes and diode lasers
 1984: Elected to the National Academy of Sciences
 1989: IEEE Edison Medal for "an outstanding career in the field of electrical engineering with contributions to major advances in the field of semiconductor materials and devices".  Holonyak's former student, Russell Dupuis from the Georgia Institute of Technology, won this same award in 2007.
 1992: Charles Hard Townes Award of the Optical Society of America 
 1993: NAS Award for the Industrial Application of Science
 1995: $500,000 Japan Prize for "outstanding contributions to research and practical applications of light emitting diodes and lasers"
 2001: Frederic Ives Medal of the Optical Society of America
 2003: IEEE Medal of Honor
 2005: Inducted as a Laureate of The Lincoln Academy of Illinois and awarded the Order of Lincoln (the State's highest honor) by the Governor of Illinois in the area of Science
 June 2006: Two of Holonyak's papers were chosen by the editors of Applied Physics Letters as among the five most important published since the journal's founding in 1962.
 November 9, 2007: Historical marker installed on the University of Illinois campus recognizing his development of the quantum-well laser. It is located on the Bardeen Engineering Quadrangle near where the old Electrical Engineering Research Laboratory used to stand.
 2008: Inducted into the National Inventors Hall of Fame (Announced February 14, 2008) (May 2–3, 2008 at Akron, Ohio)
 2015: Charles Stark Draper Prize for Engineering "for the invention, development, and commercialization of materials and processes for light-emitting diodes (LEDs)"
 September 2018: Village of Glen Carbon, Illinois, placed an honorary street sign on behalf of Holonyak, a former resident
 2021: Queen Elizabeth Prize for Engineering "for the creation and development of LED lighting, which forms the basis of all solid-state lighting technology". He shares the prize with his former students M. George Craford and Russel D. Dupuis, and Isamu Akasaki and Shuji Nakamura, inventors of the Blue LED.

Personal life
Holonyak and his wife, Katherine, were married for over 60 years. He died on September 18, 2022, in Urbana, Illinois, at the age of 93.

References

Further reading

External links

 Nick Holonyak Jr. on the Engineering and Technology History Wiki 
 Nick Holonyak Jr. US National Medal of Technology, 2002.

1928 births
2022 deaths
20th-century American inventors
21st-century American inventors
American people of Rusyn descent
Draper Prize winners
Electrical engineering academics
Fellows of the American Physical Society
Foreign Members of the Russian Academy of Sciences
Grainger College of Engineering alumni
IEEE Edison Medal recipients
IEEE Medal of Honor recipients
Laser researchers
Lemelson–MIT Prize
Light-emitting diode pioneers
Members of the United States National Academy of Engineering
Members of the United States National Academy of Sciences
Military personnel from Illinois
National Medal of Science laureates
National Medal of Technology recipients
Optical engineers
People from Zeigler, Illinois
Semiconductor physicists
University of Illinois Urbana-Champaign faculty